Paraclinus spectator is a species of labrisomid blenny native to the Atlantic coast of Brazil where it can be found on rocky reefs at depths of from .  This species can reach a length of  SL.

References

spectator
Fish described in 2002